Bolitoglossa flaviventris is a species of salamander in the family Plethodontidae.
It is found in Guatemala and Mexico.
Its natural habitats are subtropical or tropical moist lowland forests, arable land, plantations, and heavily degraded former forest.
It is threatened by habitat loss.

References

Bolitoglossa
Taxonomy articles created by Polbot
Amphibians described in 1936